Ryan Ervine (born 19 July 1988) is a Zimbabwean cricketer who played two List A matches and three Twenty20 matches for Southern Rocks in the 2009/10 season.

He is the brother of current Zimbabwe international Craig Ervine and former Zimbabwe international Sean Ervine. Ervine's uncle Neil and father Rory both played first-class cricket for Rhodesia B in the 1977/78 Castle Bowl competition and another uncle, Gordon Den, played for Rhodesia and Eastern province in the 1960s. Den's father, Ervine's grandfather, Alexander Den is recorded as having made one appearance for Rhodesia against the touring Australian national side in 1936.

References 

1988 births
Living people
Zimbabwean cricketers
Southern Rocks cricketers